The 1922 Vallenar earthquake occurred with a moment magnitude of 8.5–8.6 and a tsunami magnitude of 8.7 in the Atacama Region of Chile, near the border with Argentina on 11 November at 04:32 UTC. It triggered a destructive tsunami that caused significant damage to the coast of Chile and was observed as far away as Australia.

Tectonic setting
The earthquake took place along the boundary between the Nazca and South American tectonic plates, at a location where they converge at a rate of seventy millimeters a year.

Chile has been at a convergent plate boundary that generates megathrust earthquakes since the Paleozoic (500 million years ago). In historical times the Chilean coast has suffered many megathrust earthquakes along this plate boundary, including the strongest earthquake ever measured. Most recently, the boundary ruptured in 2010 in central Chile.

Damage and deaths
The earthquake caused extensive damage in a zone extending approximately from Copiapó to Coquimbo. Newspapers estimated more than 1,000 dead as a result of the quake, at least 500 of them in Vallenar. The tsunami killed several hundred people in coastal cities, especially in Coquimbo.

Total damage was estimated to be in the range of $5–25 million U.S. (1922 dollars).

Characteristics

Earthquake

The earthquake was preceded by strong foreshocks on 3 and 7 November. The main shock lasted between thirty seconds and eight minutes according to various reports.

The length of the plate boundary that ruptured during the earthquake is estimated to be 390 km (242 mi).

Tsunami
The epicenter of the earthquake was well inland and the tsunami may have been caused by a submarine slide triggered by the shaking.

At Caldera the tsunami began about 15 minutes after the earthquake, with a maximum run-up height of 7 m (23 ft). At Chañaral the tsunami had three surges, the first about an hour after the earthquake, the maximum run-up height was 9 m (30 ft). Three surges were also seen at Coquimbo, the last being the most destructive with a maximum run-up of 7 m (23 ft).

The tsunami was also observed in Callao, Peru (2.4 m, 7.9 ft), California (0.2 m, 8 in 13.0 hours delay), Hawaii (2.1 m, 6.9 ft 14.5 hours), Samoa (0.9 m, 3 ft 14.1 hours), Japan (0.3 m, 1 ft), Taiwan (0.03 m, 1 in), New Zealand (0.1 m, 3.9 in), Australia (0.2 m, 7.9 in) and the Philippines (0.1 m, 3.9 in).

See also
 List of earthquakes in 1922
 List of earthquakes in Argentina
 List of earthquakes in Chile

References

External links
 
 

Megathrust earthquakes in Chile
Vallenar
Vallenar Earthquake, 1922
1922 tsunamis
Tsunamis in New Zealand
1922 disasters in South America
1922 disasters in Oceania